The 1998 Men's World Water Polo Championship was the eighth edition of the men's water polo tournament at the World Aquatics Championships, organised by the world governing body in aquatics, the FINA. The tournament was held from 7 to 18 January 1998 in the Challenge Stadium, and was incorporated into the 1998 World Aquatics Championships in Perth, Western Australia.

Participating teams

Groups formed

Group A
 
 
 
 

Group B
 
 
 
 

Group C
 
 
 
 

Group D

Preliminary round

Group A

 January 9, 1998

 January 10, 1998

 January 11, 1998

Group B

 January 9, 1998

 January 10, 1998

 January 11, 1998

Group C

 January 9, 1998

 January 10, 1998

 January 11, 1998

Group D

 January 9, 1998

 January 10, 1998

 January 11, 1998

Second round

Group E

Preliminary round results apply.

 January 13, 1998

 January 14, 1998

 January 15, 1998

Group F

Preliminary round results apply.
 January 13, 1998

 January 14, 1998

 January 15, 1998

 January 16, 1998

Group G

 January 13, 1998

 January 14, 1998

 January 15, 1998

Final round

9th-12th place

 January 17, 1998

 January 18, 1998 — 5th place

 January 18, 1998 — 7th place

1st-4th place

Semi finals
 16 January 1998

Finals
 18 January 1998 –  Bronze Medal Match

 18 January 1998 –  Gold Medal Match

Final ranking

Medalists

References

External links
 8th FINA World Championships 1998, Perth - Water polo Men's Tournament www.fina.org
 Results
 Men Water Polo World Championship 1998 Perth www.todor66.com

1998
Men's tournament